is a railway station  is a passenger railway station located in the city of Yokosuka, Kanagawa Prefecture, Japan, operated by the private railway company Keikyū.

Lines
Hemi Station is served by the Keikyū Main Line and is located 48.1 kilometers from the northern terminus of the line at Shinagawa Station in Tokyo.

Station layout
The station consists of two elevated opposed side platforms serving two tracks on passing loops to permit the through passage of express trains. The station building is located underneath.

Platforms

History
Hemi Station was opened on April 1, 1930 as a station on the Shōnan Electric Railway, which merged with the Keihin Electric Railway on November 1, 1941. At the time, the station had a single island platform. The station was rebuilt into its current platform configuration in 1958.

Keikyū introduced station numbering to its stations on 21 October 2010; Hemi Station was assigned station number KK57.

Passenger statistics
In fiscal 2019, the station was used by an average of 5,299 passengers daily. 

The passenger figures for previous years are as shown below.

Surrounding area
 Yokosuka City Lifelong Learning Center (Manabikan)
 Yokosuka City Health Promotion Center (Sukoyakan)
 Yokosuka City Izumi Elementary School

See also
 List of railway stations in Japan

References

External links

 

Railway stations in Kanagawa Prefecture
Railway stations in Japan opened in 1930
Keikyū Main Line
Railway stations in Yokosuka, Kanagawa